Oldenburg-Land is an Amt ("collective municipality") in the district of Ostholstein, in Schleswig-Holstein, Germany. It is situated near the Baltic Sea coast, around Oldenburg in Holstein. Oldenburg is the seat of the Amt, but not part of it.

The Amt Oldenburg-Land consists of the following municipalities:

Göhl 
Gremersdorf 
Großenbrode
Heringsdorf 
Neukirchen 
Wangels

References

Ämter in Schleswig-Holstein